The Yamaha CS-80 is an analog synthesizer released in 1977. It supports true 8-voice polyphony, with two independent synthesizer layers per voice each with its own set of front panel controls, in addition to a number of hardwired preset voice settings and four parameter settings stores based on banks of subminiature potentiometers (rather than the digital programmable presets the Prophet-5 would sport soon after). 

It has exceptionally complete performer expression features, such as a layered keyboard that was both velocity-sensitive (like a piano's) and pressure-sensitive ("after-touch") but unlike most modern keyboards the aftertouch could be applied to individual voices rather than in common, and a ribbon controller allowing for polyphonic pitch-bends and glissandos. 

Production of the instrument ceased in 1980. Vying with the Sequential Circuits Prophet-5 and Oberheim OB-X polysynths for the title, the CS-80 is often described as the pre-eminent polyphonic analog synthesizer, and, together with the monophonic Moog modular  synthesizer, commands amongst the highest prices of any synthesizer.

Software and hardware emulations  
There are plug-in instrument software emulations of the CS-80 for usage in digital audio workstation, music sequencer, and other software which supports the plug-in formats that these instruments were implemented and released in: the "CS-80 V" from Arturia which was released in 2003, the "ME80" from memorymoon which was released in 2009, and the GX-80, which is a CS-80 emulation combined with its predecessor the GX-1, from Cherry Audio which was released in 2022.

There are no known hardware clones of the entire CS-80. At the 2014 NAMM Show, Studio Electronics premiered their new Boomstar SE80 synthesizer which includes a cloned filter section of the CS-80.
At the 2018 NAMM Show, Black Corporation showed Deckard's Dream, a rackmount synthesizer with CS-80 inspired architecture and features and supports polyphonic aftertouch via compatible third party external keyboards.

In 2019, Yamaha introduced the Reface CS, a 37 key mini synth, based on the CS-80.

Vangelis 

The Greek composer Vangelis used the Yamaha CS-80 extensively. He described it as "the most important synthesizer in my career — and for me the best analogue synthesizer design there has ever been ... It needs a lot of practice if you want to be able to play it properly, but that’s because it’s the only synthesizer I could describe as being a real instrument, mainly because of the keyboard — the way it’s built and what you can do with it."

The CS-80's features can be heard on the Blade Runner soundtrack by Vangelis, in which CS-80 is featured prominently, as well as the composer's soundtrack for the film Chariots of Fire, and the bassline of Peter Howell's interpretation of the 1980 theme tune to the BBC science fiction show Doctor Who.

See also
Yamaha GX-1, a polyphonic synthesizer released in 1973
 CS-15
 CS-60

References

Bibliography

External links
 Detailed info page
 VintageSynth.com Article

CS-80
Polyphonic synthesizers
Analog synthesizers